Witton Gilbert railway station served the village of Witton Gilbert, County Durham, England from 1862 to 1963 on the Lanchester Valley Line.

History 
The station opened on 1 September 1862 by the North Eastern Railway. The station was situated on the west side of a track running south from Wallnook Lane. This station's track was not doubled by the NER, possibly due to there being a low demand for collieries. Like all of the other stations on the line, the station closed to passengers on 1 May 1939. Like the other stations, the station was still used for Miners' Gala until 17 July 1954. The station was closed to goods traffic on 30 July 1963.

References

External links 

Disused railway stations in County Durham
Former North Eastern Railway (UK) stations
Railway stations in Great Britain opened in 1862
Railway stations in Great Britain closed in 1963
1862 establishments in England
1963 disestablishments in England
Langley Park, County Durham